Duncan Mackenzie (17 May 1861 – 1934) was a Scottish archaeologist, whose work focused on one of the more spectacular 20th century archaeological finds, Crete's palace of Knossos, the proven centre of Minoan civilisation.

Early biography

Duncan MacKenzie was born on 17 May 1861 in the small, Gaelic-speaking village of Aultgowrie, in the highlands of eastern Scotland, 15 miles from the coastal town of Inverness, in Ross and Cromarty. Queen Victoria had been on the throne of the United Kingdom since 1837. As is indicated by his last name, Duncan's father, Alexander, was an offshoot of the Mackenzie clan, whose territory stretched in a band westward across Scotland. In the clan system, the chiefs, guardians of the clan, were generally well-to-do, holding clan lands in trust, but later appropriating them as private property. They resided in castles on estates. The rest of the clan members were not so, but tended to be poor families dependent in some way on the chiefs. Alexander held the position of gamekeeper of the Fairburn Estate, on which Aultgowrie was located. It was at the confluence of highland streams. The owners were the MacKenzies of Seaforth, a branch of the clan. They had a mill, and raised sheep.

Duncan was the fourth of nine children of Alexander and his wife, Margaret Kennedy MacKenzie. He was named after his grandfather, Duncan. His mother was the eldest daughter of Murdoch Kennedy, a schoolteacher. The family spoke Gaelic at home. When they went to school they were required to learn English. Duncan was thus raised in a large-family, bilingual environment.

He studied philosophy at the University of Edinburgh; and received his PhD from Vienna in classical archaeology.

Professional career
Appointed field supervisor of the excavation of Phylakopi by the British School at Athens, he worked closely with a team of professional archaeologists including Arthur Evans and David George Hogarth. They were investigating the provenance of Mycenaean pottery as defined by Heinrich Schliemann. After a few years they realised that Phylakopi was not going to yield that information. The evidence pointed toward Crete. Evans and Hogarth left Phylakopi, while MacKenzie stayed on to wind the excavation down.

Within a few years the secession of Crete from the Ottoman Empire opened opportunities to excavate there. Hogarth was the first to discover it. He sent for Evans immediately, as the Phylakopi crew had been a very close-knit team. Purchasing the land at Knossos, Evans began excavation, sending for the third member of the team, MacKenzie, who took up his old position as supervisor of excavation. In her book on the Evans family (of which she was the latest member, being Arthur's half-sister), Time and Chance, Joan Evans gives this verbal portrait of MacKenzie in his prime:
Mackenzie was a Scot with an inaudible Highland voice, a brush of red hair, an uncertain temper, a great command of languages, and great experience in keeping the records of an excavation. Arthur Evans recognised his gifts, and endured his suspicious temper and his valetudinarian ways with exemplary patience.

Hogarth left for other excavations and then other careers, but Evans and MacKenzie collaborated so closely on the excavation of Knossos and theorisation about it that the ideas of the two men are not distinguishable from each other. MacKenzie kept the day book, or log of daily discoveries and served as a middle man between Evans and the inhabitants of Crete. MacKenzie also wrote contributions of his own. The British connotation of "assistant" does not convey the true relationship. A PhD and professional archaeologist in his own right, MacKenzie was every bit the peer of Evans, His position as second-in-command was only a social convention. The two would work together for the next thirty years, long after the excavation was complete (1905). MacKenzie remained as curator of the site, taking up residence in the new Villa Ariadne constructed as headquarters in 1906 on the hill above the site. Prior to then the archaeologists resided and worked in a Turkish house below the site, which leaked apparently irreparably and provided difficult access to the site.

Tales of the end
According to Evans, Mackenzie came to suffer from severe alcoholism and could not only no longer function as curator, but was fast declining into a demented state. Evans placed him in an institution, where he died not long after. Joan Evans reports that Mackenzie had become very difficult to work with during the latter years of his curatorship because of "the gradual onset of his illness." It has also been said that Evans found Mackenzie one night passed out on a table and fired him the next day. Friends of Mackenzie disputed this, saying he did not drink. Whether the problem was alcoholism, denied for some reason by his family, or one of the brain disorders often inflicting the elderly, which Duncan then was, or some combination, Joan adds that he died in 1935 in a state of "mental aberration."

Whatever they were, none of the final events can have been any surprise at all to Arthur, least of all any implication that Duncan was leading some sort of unknown alcoholic life until discovered suddenly one day lying in a stupor on a table. Long after the deaths of both men, after the decipherment of Linear B, attempts were made to insert an imaginary opposition and conflict between the two over the date of the Linear B tablets, which, in the slander, caused Arthur to discredit Duncan with malice aforethought and hustle him off the scene. During the lives of the two men is no indication at all in their writings of any such disagreement; moreover, Evans was of a highly charitable character, nor has the veracity of either man ever been questioned during his lifetime, as was Heinrich Schliemann's (from which he was vindicated).

Post-mortem dispute
After Mackenzie's death in Italy, some of Evans' system of Minoan dating came into question. Mackenzie's meticulous work was the key witness in defence of Evans' work. Though there was conflict between Evans and Mackenzie, Evans respected Mackenzie for his contributions to the excavation and paid tribute to his right-hand man in the last volume of The Palace of Minos.

See also

 Linear B
 Mycenaean pottery

Notes

References

External links

Scottish archaeologists
People from Ross and Cromarty
Alumni of the University of Edinburgh
1861 births
1934 deaths